Kalousi is a village in the municipality of Erymanthos, Achaea, Greece. It is located in a mountainous area of inland of north Peloponnese peninsula, north-northwest of mount Erymanthos. The village is 9 km south of Chalandritsa and 15 km by road. In 2011 Kalousi had a population of 163.

Population

See also
List of settlements in Achaea

References

Populated places in Achaea